Nozomi Sasaki may refer to:

 Nozomi Sasaki (model) (born 1988), Japanese model
 Nozomi Sasaki (voice actress) (born 1983), Japanese voice actress